Tiffanie may refer to:

Tiffanie (given name)
Tiffanie, another name of the Asian Semi-longhair breed of domestic cat

See also
Tiffany (disambiguation)